Nikolaus "Niki" Mayr-Melnhof (born 9 November 1978 in Leoben) is an Austrian racing driver currently competing in the Blancpain Sprint Series for Phoenix Racing (Germany). He previously competed in the FIA GT1 World Championship for Vita4one Racing

Career
In 2008 he contested the GT4 European Cup in an Aston Martin V8 Vantage N24 run by the Jetalliance Racing team, winning the first race of the season at Silverstone and again at Oschersleben. In 2010 he contested the first half of the FIA GT3 European Championship season, driving a Team S-Berg BMW Alpina B6 GT3 alongside Martin Matzke, the pair claiming a fourth place finish in the second race at Brno. Later that year he made his FIA GT1 World Championship debut at the Algarve round, driving a Maserati MC12 for the Hegersport team alongside Alessandro Pier Guidi. In 2011 Mayr-Melnhof took part in the full FIA GT3 European Championship in a Reiter Engineering Lamborghini Gallardo as teammate to Albert von Thurn und Taxis. The pair finished eighth in the standings, with race wins at Navarra and Paul Ricard. He also did three rounds of the Blancpain Endurance Series.

Mayr-Melnhof is racing a BMW Z4 GT3 in the GT1 World Championship in 2012 for BMW Team Vita4One, with fellow Austrian Mathias Lauda as his teammate.

Racing record

FIA GT competition results

GT1 World Championship results

Complete FIA GT Series results

Complete Blancpain Sprint Series results

References

External links
 

1978 births
Living people
People from Leoben
Austrian racing drivers
FIA GT1 World Championship drivers
Blancpain Endurance Series drivers
24 Hours of Spa drivers
ADAC GT Masters drivers
24 Hours of Daytona drivers
WeatherTech SportsCar Championship drivers
Sportspeople from Styria
Audi Sport drivers
W Racing Team drivers
Phoenix Racing drivers
Abt Sportsline drivers
Nürburgring 24 Hours drivers
24H Series drivers